Rasbora johannae is a species of ray-finned fish in the genus Rasbora. It is endemic to Kalimantan.

Etymology
The fish is named in memory of British politician Joan Helen Vickers (1907-1994), a British Conservative London Councillor and Member of Parliament and later the chairman of the Anglo-Indonesian Society.

References 

Siebert, D.J. and S. Guiry, 1996. Rasbora johannae (Teleostei: Cyprinidae), a new species of the R. trifasciata-complex from Kalimantan, Indonesia. Cybium 29(4):395-404.

Rasboras
Freshwater fish of Borneo
Taxa named by Darrell J. Siebert
Taxa named by Sioban Guiry
Fish described in 1996